is a municipality in Agder county, Norway. It is located on the Skagerrak coast in the traditional region of Sørlandet. The administrative centre of Risør municipality is the town of Risør. There are many villages in Risør such as Akland, Bossvika, Fie, Hødnebø, Krabbesund, Moen, Nipe, Røysland, Sandnes, Sivik, Søndeled, and Stamsø.

Risør is a tourist destination, and the surrounding area includes many small lakes and hills. Together with its coastline, Risør is known for its tourist attractions such as the wooden boat festival which is staged during the first week of August every year. It also has a growing reputation as the regional capital of arts and crafts, which culminates in the "Villvin-festival" during the summer holiday.

The  municipality is the 302nd largest by area out of the 356 municipalities in Norway. Risør is the 147th most populous municipality in Norway with a population of 6,735.

General information

The town of Risør was established as a municipality on 1 January 1838 (see formannskapsdistrikt law). On 1 January 1901, a part of the neighboring Søndeled municipality (population: 658) was transferred to Risør. During the 1960s, there were many municipal mergers across Norway due to the work of the Schei Committee. On 1 January 1964, the rural municipality of Søndeled (population: 3,134) was merged into the town of Risør (population: 3,002) to form a new municipality of Risør which had a population of 6,136. On 1 January 1984, the uninhabited Folevatnet area of neighboring Tvedestrand was transferred to Risør.

Name
The name for the town (and municipality) of Risør likely comes from the Old Norse name . The first element is rís which means "thicket" and the last element is eyjar which is the plural form of "island". The relatively more modern Danish version of eyjar is øer, hence the current spelling of Risør. The name originally referred to the nearby island of Risøya which is located just outside the town of Risør. The old name of the town (prior to 1909) was Øster Riisöer or Østerrisør (meaning "eastern Risør"). After 1909, it was simply called Risør. The first element was added in the 16th century to distinguish the town from Vesterrisør, the old name of Mandal.

Coat of arms
The coat of arms was granted on 18 July 1891. The blue, black, and white arms show a lighthouse on a rocky island surrounded by water. There are two white stars in the top corners of the arms. The lighthouse was chosen to symbolize the Holmen fortress built in 1788. The history of these arms is quite curious. It is said that on 18 July 1891 King Oscar II visited the town of Risør so a menu had to be printed. It was printed with a coat of arms on the top, which was probably designed by the printer. That afternoon the King approved the new arms, mainly because his name was printed under the arms on the menu.

Churches
The Church of Norway has two parishes within the municipality of Risør. It is part of the Aust-Nedenes prosti (deanery) in the Diocese of Agder og Telemark.

Politics
In the 2007 municipal elections, Risør had the highest vote for the Red Electoral Alliance in Norway at 13.7 per cent. Also, Knut Henning Thygesen was elected as the only mayor from the Red Party through a direct mayor election.

History

The village of Risør was a small fishing village in the prestegjeld of Søndeled when Dutch vessels began to call there to purchase timber around the year 1570. By 1607, two inns had been opened to serve Dutch sailors. In 1630, Risør became a privileged port (ladested). The town has a timber church, Risør Church which was built in the Baroque style in 1647.

In 1723, Risør was granted town status which granted it a number of commercial privileges. By the end of the 18th century, 96 sailing vessels were owned by Risør merchants. It was the sixth largest shipping town and one of four shipbuilding centers in Norway.

In Letters on Sweden, Norway, and Denmark, Mary Wollstonecraft wrote extensively while visiting Risør in 1783, including the following remarks:
 On entering Risør: "We were a considerable time entering amongst the islands, before we saw about two hundred houses crowded together under a very high rock—still higher appearing above."
 While at Risør: "...seaports are not favorable to improvement. The captains acquire a little superficial knowledge by traveling, which their indefatigable attention to the making of money prevents their digesting; and the fortune that they thus laboriously acquire is spent, as it usually is in towns of this description, in show and good living."
 While departing Risør: "The view of the town was now extremely fine. A huge rocky mountain stood up behind it, and a vast cliff stretched on each side, forming a semicircle. In a recess of the rocks was a clump of pines, amongst which a steeple rose picturesquely beautiful."

Risør played a role in the Napoleonic Wars in 1807–1814, when Denmark–Norway took France's side, and therefore became the enemy of Norway's most important trading-partner: Great Britain. (It is from this period that Henrik Ibsen took his subject, when he created his famous poem Terje Vigen.)

On 1 January 1838, the new formannskapsdistrikt law came into effect, granting each parish and town in Norway the rights to have a self-governing council. Thus, Risør was a small town with a council to run it.

Risør was almost wiped off the map in 1861. A great fire swept across the small town leaving just 85 houses and the 1647 Risør Church. The entire road network was re-worked after the fire to remove the small streets and alleys and have wider roads that are there today. The city was redesigned and rebuilt and today it presents a positive impression of a well kept town with white, wooden houses. White was chosen because it was an expensive paint and the residents wanted to give an expression of prosperity. Still today, most houses have white paint, although some have other colors on the sides and back of their houses.

By the second half of the 19th century, over 100 sailing vessels were based at their home port in Risør and more than 1,000 sailors called Risør home. The transition to steamships and the economic damage of World War I, however, destroyed Risør's shipping industry.

On 1 January 1901, an area of the neighboring municipality of Søndeled (population: 658) was transferred to the city, greatly expanding Risør. During the 1960s, there were many municipal mergers across Norway due to the work of the Schei Committee. On 1 January 1964, the town of Risør (population: 3,002) and the entire municipality of Søndeled (population: 3,134) were merged to form a new, much larger municipality of Risør, with the town being the administrative centre.

Geography
Risør is the easternmost coastal municipality in Agder county, located on the peninsula between the mouths of the Søndeledfjorden and Sandnesfjorden, providing ready access to the Skagerrak. Risør municipality is bordered to the southwest by Tvedestrand, to the northwest by Vegårshei and Gjerstad, and to the northeast by Kragerø in Vestfold og Telemark county. The Nordfjorden is a branch of the Søndeledfjorden that flows to the north of the large island of Barmen.

Government
All municipalities in Norway, including Risør, are responsible for primary education (through 10th grade), outpatient health services, senior-citizen services, unemployment and other social services, zoning, economic development, and municipal roads. The municipality is governed by a municipal council of elected representatives, which in turn elect a mayor.  The municipality falls under the Agder District Court and the Agder Court of Appeal.

Municipal council
The municipal council of Risør is made up of 29 representatives that are elected to four-year terms. Currently, the party breakdown is as follows:

Transportation
Risør is located along the Skaggerak coast. The Stangholmen Lighthouse sits just offshore, marking a shipping channel leading to the town harbour. The European route E18 highway runs along the western edge of the municipality. The Norwegian County Road 416 connects the E18 highway with the town centre in the eastern side of the municipality. Other main roads in Risør include Norwegian County Road 411 and Norwegian County Road 418.

Economy
Risør was a town built as a result of shipping and industrial interests. The historic timber and fishing industries thrived for a few hundred years, but now they have mostly vanished. Paper production served as an economic basis for a time, until the pulp factory was closed in 1970. Today Risør is more of a tourist destination with a burgeoning art colony and music festivals. Summer vacationers account for a major part of the economy.

Attractions
Risør has many tourist attractions.
 A world class chamber music festival, is held in late June
 A bluegrass music-festival every mid-July. Norway's only festival of its kind.
 A popular artists’ market (Villvinmarked or "Villvin-festival") is held in July
 A wooden boat festival (Trebåtfestival) is held in August. During the festival the population swells to 20,000 people.
 Den Hellige Ånds Church, built in 1647
 The citadel at Tangen, a fortification from the Napoleonic Wars (with modifications from the German occupation period)
 Risør Akvarium, salt water aquarium with over 100 different species. The only salt water aquarium in the south region of Norway.

Notable residents

 Isak Lauritssøn Falck (1601–1669), a land owner and timber merchant, developed Risør 
 Christian Jensen Lofthuus (1750-1797) led a peasant revolt in 1786 called Lofthusreisingen
 Henrik Carstensen (1753–1835) timber merchant, shipowner, rep. Norwegian Constituent Assembly
 Carsten Henrik Bruun (1828–1907) shipmaster of whaling vessels, also involved in sealing 
 Nikolai Prebensen (1850–1938) politician and County Governor of Finnmark & Aust-Agder
 Dikken Zwilgmeyer (1853–1913) a Norwegian fiction writer of children's literature
 Isak Martinius Skaugen (1875–1962) a sea captain, founded I. M. Skaugen a shipping co.
 Ove Ansteinsson (1884–1942), a journalist and author
 Per Sunderland (1924–2012) a Norwegian stage and film actor 
 Victor D. Norman (born 1946) politician & professor of economy and rector at NHH 
 Carl Magnus Neumann (born 1944) jazz saxophonist, lived in Risør since 2000
 Knut Henning Thygesen (born 1953) author and politician, Mayor of Risør from 2007 
 Erik Mykland (born 1971) a footballer with 371 club caps and 78 for Norway

References

External links

 
Municipal fact sheet from Statistics Norway 
Risor Rødt 
Risør kommune 
Risør Wooden Boat Festival annually in August 
Tourist Information Risør 
Visit Risør
 
Det Lille Hotel 
Aust Agder News 
Risør chamber music festival 
Culture in Risør on the map 
Map of Aust-Agder including Risør municipality 
Risørby – facts and pictures of Risør 
 

 
Municipalities of Agder
1838 establishments in Norway